Westridge is a residential area in Rawalpindi, Pakistan, which dates back to 1880 when the British Army first came into this area and established its cantonment in Rawalpindi, amongst a few other Military Units it set up here.

Initially, a few units of Signals Battalion were established here in 1916. Later on, a few other military units were moved in an effort to strengthen the hold of British Army in Rawalpindi. These units consisted of Frontier Force, Air Defense, and Artillery. Later on, Special Communication Organization was also transferred here.

In 1960, Cantonment Board allowed establishment of 3 housing schemes, namely Westridge 1, Westridge 2, and Westridge 3 in this area. As a result, Army Housing Directorate (Renamed to DHA in 1979) announced residential schemes for Army and Civilian personnel. As the population increased in due course of time and thousands of houses were constructed in the area to allow a high end life style community that offer cultural as well as educational facilities. At present it is among the most expensive residential areas in Rawalpindi, which is partly due to its proximity to Islamabad.

Educational
 Army Public School
 Fauji Foundation School
 Academia de Paradox
 Grammar Foundation School
 Beaconhouse School System
 The City School
 Pakistan Quality
 Zia Ur Rehman Teaching Hospital
 Bahria School For Girls and Boys
 Dar-e-Arqam
 The Educators
 Roots International School 
 FG Public School
Rawal College of Commerce (Proud Rawalians) (Usamii Khaan)

Local markets
 Headlines Beauty Clinic & Studios
 Westridge Bazar
 Pasban Welfare Complex
 CSD (Canteen Stores Department) - Westridge 1
 Allah Abad Market - Westridge 3
 CSD Mega Mall - Westridge 2
 Center Point - Allahabad

Since year 1985, civilian purchase of land and houses skyrocketed in this area, and as a result, the current population is a mix of Civil and Military population.

Rawalpindi District
Housing in Pakistan